Moussa Dao (born 26 August 1992) is a Burkinabé professional football player who currently plays as a defensive midfielder for Al-Talaba, which competes in the Iraqi Premier League, the top division in Iraq.

References

External links
 
 

1992 births
Living people
Burkinabé footballers
Burkina Faso international footballers
Association football midfielders
Egyptian Premier League players
Al Masry SC players
Pyramids FC players
Aswan SC players
Al-Talaba SC players
Expatriate footballers in Egypt
Expatriate footballers in Kuwait
Expatriate footballers in Iraq
Al Jahra SC players
Burkinabé expatriate sportspeople in Kuwait
Burkinabé expatriate sportspeople in Egypt
Burkinabé expatriate sportspeople in Iraq
Kuwait Premier League players
21st-century Burkinabé people